is an arrow given at Shinto shrines and Buddhist temples as a Japanese New Year's lucky charm or sacred tool.

In addition to this, bows and arrows are set up on top of the building facing the demon's gate as a curse during the topping ceremony when a new house is built. It is also customary for relatives and acquaintances to give Fuma-ya or Fuma-bow to newborns for their first birthday .

It is said to have originated from bows and arrows used in an event called "Jalai", which was held on New Year's Day to test archery skills. Originally, the word "hama" referred to the target used in the event. The arrows used to shoot these targets were called "Hama arrows" and the bows were called "Hama bows. As "Hama" means "demon," the custom of giving toys made of bows and arrows to families with boys at New Year's was born. Later, it came to be given at Hatsumodes as a lucky charm to bring good luck for the year .

The Concept of Hamaya 

In Buddhism, there is a tradition that the golden bow and arrow held by Umarekkya, one of the Four Nightfellows who follow the Blue-Faced Vajra, is the origin of the demon arrow, and the Dragon God Demon Arrow is sold at Rinnō-ji in Nikko, where the Four Nightfellows are enshrined.。

In Japan, since ancient times, there has been little practice of casting spells, but there are many practices of breaking evil against spells. The reason why the tip of a demon arrow is not sharp is that it does not need to be a sharp blade to break and purify the evil spirits, evil intentions, evil ways, evil minds, etc. that are generated by the hindrance rather than the target person or object itself.

Although only the demon arrows are commonly distributed, they are officially effective in breaking and purifying obstacles only when shot with a demon bow. The reason why ordinary people have a Fu-Ma-Ya is because the Fu-Ma-Ya bow is held by a god, a Shinto priest, or a person who has the ability to break evil, and the owner of the Fu-Ma-Ya can shoot it by presenting the arrow to the demon he wants to break.

Trademark 
The Trademarks for "Hamaya," a small bow with a talisman and other items attached to it, had been registered by a Kanagawa Prefecture-based company called Hamaya Bohanseisho, but the company did not renew the trademark registration several years ago  did not renew the trademark registration. Because of this, NHK, which used to describe them in the news as "arrows to ward off evil", has recently started to use the term [since when?] In the past, NHK used the term "demon arrow" in news reports.

Footnotes

Related Items 

 Nitta Shrine - Tokyo, Ōta, Tokyo
 Hiraga Gennai's arrow guard: said to be the origin of the offering to worshippers .
 Kiyoshi Shrine:Three demon arrows
 Ogasa Shrine:Yaflet Festival
 Ikuko Shrine:Hinode Festival
 Tan-nuri arrow
 Yakusanoikazuchi

Trademarks
Shinto religious objects
New Year in Japan
Japanese folk religion
Buddhist culture
Shinto
Japanese culture